Anywhere You Go is the first full-length recording from David Pack, the lead singer for the band Ambrosia.  The LP was released in November 1985. Pack wrote five songs himself and co-wrote the other five.

The album contains three charting singles.  One of the tracks, "Prove Me Wrong", was used in the movie White Nights and was Pack's only solo entry in the US Billboard Hot 100, peaking at number 95.  The songs "I Just Can't Let Go" and "That Girl Is Gone" placed in the Top 20 on the US Adult Contemporary chart.

Track listing
All tracks composed by David Pack; except where indicated
"Anywhere You Go" (Pack, Mike Porcaro, Jai Winding) 5:00
"I Just Can't Let Go" 4:54 
"Won't Let You Lose Me" (Goodrum, James Newton Howard, Pack) 3:37
"My Baby" 4:17
"That Girl Is Gone" 4:46
"She Don't (Come Around Anymore)" (James Ingram, Michael McDonald, Pack) 5:26
"Do Ya" (Jamie Bernstein, Pack) 4:48
"Prove Me Wrong" (from the Columbia motion picture White Nights) (Howard, Pack) 4:20
"No Direction (No Way Home)" 5:46
"Just Be You" 4:15

Charts

Singles

Production
Produced by David Pack & Michael Verdick (except "Prove Me Wrong", produced by David Pack and James Newton Howard)
Executive Producers: Michael "Mo" Ostin, Lenny Waronker
Engineered by Ben Rodgers, Ross Pallone, Michael Verdick
String Engineer: Allen Sides
Mixed by Mick Guzauski, Ian Eales, Ben Rodgers, Michael Verdick, Bill Schnee, David Schober
Mix Assistants: Daren Klein, Richard McKernan
Audio Mastering: Doug Sax

Personnel
David Pack — guitars, lead and backing vocals, keyboards (except on "Won't Let You Lose Me"), Oberheim DMX programming, bass on "My Baby", vocal arrangements on "I Just Can't Let Go" and "My Baby"
George Perilli — drums (except on "Anywhere You Go", "Do Ya", and "Prove Me Wrong")
Burleigh Drummond — percussion (except on "Do Ya"), backing vocals and vocal arrangement on "My Baby"
James Newton Howard — keyboards (except on "Anywhere You Go", "I Just Can't Let Go", "That Girl Is Gone", and "Do Ya"), string arrangements
Joe Puerta — bass on "Won't Let You Lose Me" and "That Girl Is Gone", backing vocals and vocal arrangements on "My Baby" and "That Girl Is Gone"
Kerry Livgren — keyboards on "Anywhere You Go", guitar solos on "My Baby" and "Do Ya"
Mike Porcaro — bass on "Anywhere You Go"
Prairie Prince — drums on "Anywhere You Go"
Jai Winding — keyboards on "Anywhere You Go"
Ernie Watts — saxophone on "I Just Can't Let Go"
Michael McDonald — backing vocals and vocal arrangements on "I Just Can't Let Go" and "She Don't"
James Ingram — backing vocals and vocal arrangement on "I Just Can't Let Go"
Jerry Hey — horn arrangement on "My Baby"
Royce Jones — backing vocals and vocal arrangement on "My Baby"
Paulinho Da Costa — percussion on "That Girl Is Gone" and "Do Ya"
John Elefante — backing vocals on "That Girl Is Gone"
Will McGregor — bass on "She Don't" and "Just Be You"
John "J.R." Robinson — drums on "Do Ya"
Stanley Clarke — bass on "Do Ya"
Jamie Bernstein — Oberheim DMX programming on "Do Ya"
David "Hawk" Wolinski — E-mu Emulator programming on "Do Ya" and "Prove Me Wrong"
Jennifer Holliday — backing vocals on "Do Ya"
Jeff Porcaro — drums on "Prove Me Wrong"
Lisa Harrison — backing vocals on "Just Be You"
Cynthia Rhodes — backing vocals on "Just Be You"

References

1985 debut albums
Warner Records albums
David Pack albums